Air Marshal Sir Aubrey Beauclerk Ellwood,  (3 July 1897 – 20 December 1992) was a senior Royal Air Force commander.

RAF career
Educated at Marlborough College, Ellwood joined the Royal Naval Air Service in 1916. During his service as a fighter pilot in the First World War, he scored ten victories (all in the Sopwith Camel) to become a double flying ace, being awarded the Distinguished Service Cross in the process. Having been awarded one of the first permanent commissions in the Royal Air Force in 1919, he was appointed Officer Commanding No. 5 Squadron in India in 1932 before returning to the UK in 1937 to join the Directing Staff at the RAF Staff College.

Ellwood served in the Second World War as Deputy Director of Bomber Operations before becoming Air Officer Commanding No. 18 Group in January 1943 and then Senior Air Staff Officer at Headquarters Coastal Command in March 1944. He completed his was service as Director-General of Personnel.

After the war Ellwood was appointed the Air Officer Commanding in Chief Bomber Command. His next and last tour was as Air Officer Commanding in Chief Transport Command before retiring in January 1952.

In retirement he became Deputy Lieutenant of Somerset. Also Governor & Commandant of the Church Lads' Brigade from 1954 to 1970.

References

External links
 Imperial War Museum Interview

|-

1897 births
1992 deaths
Deputy Lieutenants of Somerset
English aviators
Knights Commander of the Order of the Bath
People educated at Marlborough College
Recipients of the Distinguished Service Cross (United Kingdom)
Royal Air Force air marshals of World War II
Royal Naval Air Service aviators
Royal Naval Air Service personnel of World War I